Kleinsmith may refer to:

Charles Kleinsmith (1904-1942), a United States Navy petty officer and Navy Cross recipient
, the name of more than one United States Navy ship